Tianwen-4, formerly known as Gan De, is a planned interplanetary mission by China to study the Jovian system and its environs, sharing a launch with a spacecraft which will make a flyby of Uranus.

Overview 
The goals of the planned Tianwen-4 Jupiter mission were detailed in an article published in a Chinese academic journal, they include the following: study of the interaction between magnetic fields and plasma present in the Jovian system, examination of the compositional variations in the Jovian atmosphere, exploration of the internal structures and surface characteristics of either Ganymede or Callisto, as well as investigation of the space environment surrounding the aforementioned Galilean satellites.

According to reports in the Western media, there are two competing mission profiles as of January 2021: the 'Jupiter Callisto Orbiter' (JCO) and the 'Jupiter System Observer' (JSO). 'JCO' would involve a spacecraft conducting fly-bys of Jupiter's irregular satellites before it enters into a polar orbit about Callisto; this mission profile also may include a Callisto lander. In contrast, the 'JSO' mission profile, while broadly similar to that of 'JCO', would forgo an attempt by a spacecraft to orbit Callisto and instead would focus on more intensive studies of the Galilean moon Io (the 'JSO' mission profile also does not appear to include a lander though it may involve sending the spacecraft to the Sun-Jupiter L1 point at the conclusion of its tour of the Jovian system). Finally, presentations by Chinese researchers suggest that the Tianwen-4 Jupiter mission may include an additional probe that would conduct a fly-by of Uranus sometime after 2040.

The original name of this mission referenced the fourth century BCE Chinese astronomer Gan De, who made early planetary observations and reputedly first observed the Galilean moons with the unaided eye.

Background 
On October 15, 2003, CNSA launched China's first independent crewed orbital mission; subsequently it prosecuted successful robotic lunar orbital missions (Chang'e 1 and Chang'e 2) and a robotic lunar lander/rover mission (Chang'e 3). In the hope of building upon these achievements, CNSA began to contemplate more ambitious interplanetary missions in the 2020s and beyond. In 2018, Pei Zhaoyu, the deputy director of CNSA's Lunar Exploration and Space Program Center stated that China was planning to conduct four major interplanetary missions before the end of the 2020s; the four missions include a mission to Mars (Tianwen-1), a main-belt comet and asteroid sample-return mission (Tianwen-2), a Mars sample-return mission (Tianwen-3), and a Jupiter system mission. As of early 2021, the aforementioned JCO and JSO mission profiles are competing to be realized as the Tianwen-4 Jupiter system mission.

Possible mission timeline 
One possible Earth-Jupiter mission trajectory and timeline was presented at the 2020 General Assembly meetings of the EGU. Under this scenario, the Tianwen-4 probe would launch in October 2029, conduct a Venus fly-by six months later in April 2030, then proceed to encounter Earth twice (the first encounter occurring in February 2031  and the second in May 2033), with a Jupiter arrival in August 2035 for a total transit time of 5.87 years.

Mission architecture 
As of 2021, one of the two following mission profiles (JCO and JSO) is likely to resemble the final mission architecture:

Jupiter Callisto Orbiter (JCO) 
JCO would fly by several irregular Jovian satellites before entering a polar orbit around Callisto. This scenario includes a possible lander which, like the Chang’e lunar landers, would provide unprecedented insights into the moon's formation and evolution. Callisto is the outermost of the four Galilean moons. Its interior experiences less heating due to gravity from the other moons and Jupiter. It likely formed with leftover Jupiter material and has sat mostly dormant since, with only asteroid impacts to modify its surface. The moon thus preserves a history of the early Jupiter system and the Solar System at large for a lander to study. Callisto also has a thin atmosphere with small amounts of oxygen, increasing its scientific allure despite being less glamorous than fellow subsurface ocean moons Europa and Ganymede and volatile, active Io. Callisto is also the least challenging Jovian moon to land on. A spacecraft requires less fuel to reach it, and it sits outside Jupiter's intense radiation field. These are rationales that argue for Callisto as the main mission target. JCO also includes a secondary spacecraft that would independently fly towards and encounter with Uranus sometime in the late 2040s.

Jupiter Systems Observer (JSO) 
JSO would substitute a possible Callisto landing with an in-depth investigation of the Jovian moon Io. The spacecraft would perform several Io flybys, studying how Jupiter's gravity tugs on the moon to power its volcanic activity. JSO would also study the mass, density, dynamics and chemical and isotopic composition of irregular satellites and would provide insights into these unique remnants of Jupiter's formation. As an option, JSO could release one or several small satellites to perform multi-point studies of the dynamics of the Jovian magnetosphere.

At the end of its tour JSO could be sent to orbit the Sun-Jupiter L1 point, where the planet's gravity balances with the Sun's in a way that spacecraft can remain there for long periods of time. From this unique perch where no spacecraft has ever visited, JSO could monitor the solar wind outside of Jupiter's magnetic field, and survey the irregular Jovian moons from afar.

Mission instruments 
Potential scientific instruments for the Tianwen-4 mission were discussed during a session of the 2020 General Assembly of the European Geosciences Union that took place in May 2020. The possible instruments were categorized into four payload packages designed to address the two main goals of the mission: answering questions on the formation and current "workings" of the Jovian system (the actual instruments selected would depend on whether JCO or JSO is selected as the mission profile.) The four payload packages are: (A) plasma and dust analyzers, (B) multi-wavelength spectroscopic instruments, (C) geology/glaciology/geochemistry analyzers, and (D) radio/optical links and radio science instruments.

Plasma and dust analyzers package

 Thermal plasma spectrometer (100 eV to 100 keV)
 High-energy charged particle detector and energetic neutral atom (ENA) analyzer
 Ion and neutral mass spectrometer
 Magnetometer
 Radio and plasma wave spectrometer
 Cosmic dust detector with mass spectrometer

Multi-wavelength imaging/spectroscopy package

 Visible-wavelength imaging camera
 Near-infrared imager/spectrometer
 Far-infrared/submillimeter wave radiometer/spectrometer
 Ultra-violet imager/spectrometer

Geology/glaciology/geochemistry analyzers package

 High-mass resolution and large mass range mass spectrometer
(fed-by sampling system for ice surface and by pyrolyser [for refractory component])

Radio + optical link + radio science package

 Transmission/reception radio link to Earth for Doppler tracking and occultation measurements
 Inter-platform radio links for additional Doppler tracking and occultation measurements
 "PRIDE" astrometry experiment (Very-long-baseline interferometry tracking of each flight element)
 Altimeter (with meter-level accuracy)

Notes

References

External links 

Chinese space probes
2029 in spaceflight
2029 in China
Missions to Jupiter
Missions to Uranus
Proposed space probes